This is a list of the rivers of the Federated States of Micronesia, arranged by State:

Chuuk
Wichen

Kosrae
Infal Mutunte
Infal Yekula
Infal Sialat
Infal Innem
Infal Sunganspaul
Infal Tofol
Infal Kaa
Infal Tafuyat
Infal Pilyuul
Infal Malem
Infal Yeseng
Infal Finkol
Infal Palusrik
Infal Menka
Infal Utwa
Infal Isra
Infal Falwe
Infal Yemulil
Infal Lukunlulem
Infal Panyea
Infal Mwot
Infal Lenwot
Infal Saksro
Infal Wiyu
Infal Yela
Infal Las
Infal Okat
Infal Melo

Pohnpei
Pilan Dauen Neu
Pilan Lewi
Pilan Kiepw
Pilan Meitik
Pilan Sepeipei
Pilan Luhke
Pilan Kepin Awak
Pilan Pweikamw
Pilan Tuweri
Pilan Ohwa
Pilan Semwei
Pilan Pahnahdo
Pilan Pwadapwad
Pilan Kitamw
Pilan Lehdau
Pilan nan Kerepene
Pilan nan Riohk
Pilan en Senipehn
Pilan Nankep
Pilan en Mahud
Pilan Mese
Pilan Kihlid
Pilan en Lohd
Pilan Neh
Pilan Nanwou
Pilan Semwei
Pilan Kidar
Oalos River
Pilen Sapwtakai
Pilen Pahnihwi
Pilen Pohnahtik
Pilen Mwahi
Lehn Diepei
Pilen Pwadapwad
Lehn Mesi
Pillapen Kiti
Pilen Koamoahd
Pilen Nan Lapahu
Pillapen Pehleng
Pilen Sakartik
Pilapen Seniahdak
Pillapen Soundau
Kiriedleng
Pillapen Kepin Lahpar
Pilen Kerir
Pillapen Nankewi

References
GEOnet Names Server
USGS Topographic Map of Kosrae